Pârâul Lung may refer to the following rivers in Romania:

 Pârâul Lung, a tributary of the Aita in Covasna County
 Pârâul Lung, a tributary of the Valea Cerbului in Prahova County